Madonna with Machine Gun (Latvian: Madonna ar ložmetēju) is an oil painting by the Latvian artist Kārlis Padegs from 1932. The painting belongs to the Latvian National Museum of Art in Riga.

Description
The painting depicts a virgin woman with an innocent face nestled amongst boots and helmets. She is holding a machine gun with a long ammunition belt. The style of the painting reflects both local Baltic influences and the modern art movements of contemporary Western Europe.

References 

1932 paintings
Latvian paintings
Paintings of the Virgin Mary
Paintings in Latvia